Shaun Allen (born 23 September 1965) is an English former professional rugby league footballer who played in the 1980s and 1990s.

Playing career

County Cup Final appearances
Shaun Allen played right-, i.e. number 3, in St. Helens' 28-16 victory over Wigan in the 1984 Lancashire County Cup Final during the 1984–85 season at Central Park, Wigan on Sunday 28 October 1984, and played right-, i.e. number 3, in Oldham's 16-24 defeat by Warrington in the 1989 Lancashire County Cup Final during the 1989-90 season at Knowsley Road, St. Helens on Saturday 14 October 1989.

References

External links
Profile at saints.org.uk
Statistics at orl-heritagetrust.org.uk

1965 births
Living people
English rugby league players
Great Britain under-21 national rugby league team players
Oldham R.L.F.C. players
Rugby league centres
Rugby league fullbacks
Rugby league hookers
Rugby league locks
Rugby league second-rows
Rugby league wingers
St Helens R.F.C. players